John Mace (7 May 1839 – 18 April 1906) was an Australian cricketer. He played one first-class match for Tasmania in 1858.

See also
 List of Tasmanian representative cricketers

References

External links
 

1839 births
1906 deaths
Australian cricketers
Tasmania cricketers
Cricketers from Sydney